Agyneta habra is a species of sheet weaver found in Africa. It was described by Locket in 1968.

References

habra
Spiders of Africa
Spiders described in 1968